Henri Couillaud (9 December 1878 in Bourg-la-Reine – February 1955) was a French classical trombonist.

He was a soloist for the Opéra de Paris, the Orchestre de la Société des Concerts du Conservatoire and the French Republican Guard Band. He wrote studies for trombone which aimed to give students a strong technicality.

He was professor of trombone at the Conservatoire de Paris from 1925 to 1948 with André Lafosse as assistant professor. He succeeded Louis Allard.

Couillaud's method (1946) emphasizes the role of air in the emission process. Couillaud promotes more concise sliding movements by using the instrument's first positions as a priority, a technique that opens up to jazz and variety music.

Works 
Vingt Études de Perfectionnement
26 Études Techniques
Trente Études Modernes
Études de style (Trombone solo)
Enseignement Complet du Trombone à Coulisse par Henri Couillaud; Études et Exercises
12 Études Melodiques
4 Études en forme de duos

External links 
 Complete Couillaud Collection
 Henri Couillaud

1878 births
1955 deaths
People from Bourg-la-Reine
French classical trombonists
Male trombonists
Academic staff of the Conservatoire de Paris
20th-century classical musicians
20th-century French musicians
20th-century classical trombonists
French music educators
20th-century French male musicians
French Republican Guard Band musicians